Alexander 'Alex' Brett Stobbs (born 30 January 1990), (Tunbridge Wells, Kent, England) is a British musician with cystic fibrosis who was the subject of the Channel 4 Cutting Edge documentary A Boy Called Alex in 2008 and its sequel, Alex: A Passion for Life in 2009, also broadcast on Channel 4.

Early life
After an early education as an academic and music scholar at Stoke Brunswick, Stobbs became a chorister at King's College, Cambridge. It was here where he recorded for EMI with King's an album including Bach's Magnificat, which he would later conduct.

His earliest inspirations were the works of Walter de la Mare and the British novelist Jo Rowling.

Stobbs was then a music scholar at Eton College, where he conducted Johann Sebastian Bach's Magnificat in March 2007. He was a choral scholar at King's College, Cambridge, where he studied music. On 5 April 2009 he conducted Bach's St Matthew Passion at Cadogan Hall, London (with Rodolfus Choir and Southbank Sinfonia) in aid of others who suffer from cystic fibrosis.

In September 2009, his book A Passion for Living was published, a diary of his life during his A-levels and his preparation for conducting a performance of Bach's Matthew Passion in April 2009.

In July 2018 he won the Royal College of Music third prize in the Joan Chissell Schumann Prize for Piano 

His musical accomplishments are in spite of significant hearing loss arising from the medications involved in the treatment of his cystic fibrosis.

Documentaries
The life-affirming story of some of his accomplishments in spite of fearsome challenges was featured in two television documentaries. Both were produced by Walker George Films and broadcast on Channel 4.

The first, A Boy Called Alex, followed Alex's determined and passionate attempt to conduct Bach's  Magnificat while suffering from cystic fibrosis. It was broadcast in 2008 and was nominated for a BAFTA in 2009.

The second documentary, titled Alex: A Passion For Life was broadcast in October 2009. It showed Stobbs' first year at King's College, Cambridge as he prepared to conduct Bach's Matthew Passion with a full orchestra in the Cadogan Hall, always with the backdrop of his struggles with cystic fibrosis.

He also appeared on UK talkshow Richard & Judy in January 2008, on which he performed Rachmaninov's Prelude in G Sharp minor, Op. 32/12.

References

External links
Alex's Official Facebook Fanpage
A Passion for Living Literary Agent Listing
The Matthew Passion Project Website
Alex Stobbs: Singing from his own hymn sheet The Telegraph, 7 September 2009
The Passion of Alex Cambridge News article, 24 January 2009
The privilege of educating Alex Times Online article, 11 January 2008
"Cutting Edge" A Boy Called Alex (2008)
Cutting Edge: A Boy Called Alex Free Video Clips from Channel 4

1990 births
Living people
British classical musicians
People from Royal Tunbridge Wells
British male conductors (music)
People educated at Eton College
Bach conductors
Alumni of King's College, Cambridge
21st-century British conductors (music)